Cattierite (CoS2) is a cobalt sulfide mineral found in the Democratic Republic of Congo. It was discovered together with the nickel sulfide vaesite by Johannes F. Vaes, a Belgian mineralologist and named after Felicien Cattier, who was chairman of the board of the Union Minière du Haut-Katanga.

The mineral belongs to the pyrite group, in which all minerals share the same building principle. The metal in the oxidation state +2 forms a sodium chloride structure together with the anion S22−. This formalism recognizes that the sulfur atoms in pyrite occur in pairs with clear S-S bonds.

It occurs with pyrite, chalcopyrite and members of the linnaeite – polydymite group in ore deposits in carbonate rocks. In addition to the type locality in the Katanga district it is reported from Gansberg, Black Forest, Germany; near Filipstad, Varmland, Sweden; Bald Knob, near Sparta, Alleghany County, North Carolina and in the Fletcher mine of Reynolds County, Missouri.

References

Cobalt minerals
Pyrite group
Cubic minerals
Minerals in space group 205
Minerals described in 1945